The opposition surge (sometimes known as the opposition effect, opposition spike or Seeliger effect) is the brightening of a rough surface, or an object with many particles, when illuminated from directly behind the observer. The term is most widely used in astronomy, where generally it refers to the sudden noticeable increase in the brightness of a celestial body such as a planet, moon, or comet as its phase angle of observation approaches zero. It is so named because the reflected light from the Moon and Mars appear significantly brighter than predicted by simple Lambertian reflectance when at astronomical opposition. Two physical mechanisms have been proposed for this observational phenomenon: shadow hiding and coherent backscatter.

Overview

The phase angle is defined as the angle between the observer, the observed object and the source of light.  In the case of the Solar System, the light source is the Sun, and the observer is generally on Earth. At zero phase angle, the Sun is directly behind the observer and the object is directly ahead, fully illuminated.

As the phase angle of an object lit by the Sun decreases, the object's brightness rapidly increases. This is mainly due to the increased area lit, but is also partly due to the intrinsic brightness of the part that is sunlit. This is affected by such factors as the angle at which light reflected from the object is observed. For this reason, a full moon is more than twice as bright as the moon at first or third quarter, even though the visible area illuminated appears to be exactly twice as large.

Physical mechanisms

Shadow hiding

When the angle of reflection is close to the angle at which the light's rays hit the surface (that is, when the Sun and the object are close to opposition from the viewpoint of the observer), this intrinsic brightness is usually close to its maximum. At a phase angle of zero degrees, all shadows disappear and the object is fully illuminated. When phase angles approach zero, there is a sudden increase in apparent brightness, and this sudden increase is referred to as the opposition surge.

The effect is particularly pronounced on regolith surfaces of airless bodies in the Solar System. The usual major cause of the effect is that a surface's small pores and pits that would otherwise be in shadow at other incidence angles become lit up when the observer is almost in the same line as the source of illumination.  The effect is usually only visible for a very small range of phase angles near zero. For bodies whose reflectance properties have been quantitatively studied, details of the opposition effect – its strength and angular extent – are described by two of the Hapke parameters. In the case of planetary rings (such as Saturn's), an opposition surge is due to the uncovering of shadows on the ring particles. This explanation was first proposed by Hugo von Seeliger in 1887.

Coherent backscatter

A theory for an additional effect that increases brightness during opposition is that of coherent backscatter.  In the case of coherent backscatter, the reflected light is enhanced at narrow angles if the size of the scatterers in the surface of the body is comparable to the wavelength of light and the distance between scattering particles is greater than a wavelength.  The increase in brightness is due to the reflected light combining coherently with the emitted light.

Coherent backscatter phenomena have also been observed with radar.  In particular, recent observations of Titan at 2.2 cm with Cassini have shown that a strong coherent backscatter effect is required to explain the high albedos at radar wavelengths.

Water droplets

On Earth, water droplets can also create bright spots around the antisolar point in various situations. For more details, see Heiligenschein and Glory (optical phenomenon).

Throughout the Solar System

The existence of the opposition surge was described in 1956 by Tom Gehrels during his study of the reflected light from an asteroid. Gehrels' later studies showed that the same effect could be shown in the moon's brightness.  He coined the term "opposition effect" for the phenomenon, but the more intuitive "opposition surge" is now more widely used.

Since Gehrels' early studies, an opposition surge has been noted for most airless solar system bodies. No such surge has been reported for bodies with significant atmospheres.

In the case of the Moon, B. J. Buratti et al. have suggested that its brightness increases by some 40% between a phase angle of 4° and one of 0°, and that this increase is greater for the rougher-surfaced highland areas than for the relatively smooth maria. As for the principal mechanism of the phenomenon, measurements indicate that the opposition effect exhibits only a small wavelength dependence: the surge is 3-4% larger at 0.41 μm than at 1.00 μm. This result suggests that the principal cause of the lunar opposition surge is shadow-hiding rather than coherent backscatter.

See also
Albedo
Bidirectional reflectance function
Brocken spectre, the apparently enormous and magnified shadow of an observer cast upon the upper surfaces of clouds opposite the Sun
Gegenschein
Geometric albedo

References

External links
 Hayabusa observes the opposition surge of Asteroid Itokawa
 opposition effect, "Atmospheric optics" website. Includes a picture of the opposition surge on the moon
 opposition effect mechanism, "Atmospheric optics" website. Diagrammatic representation of the opposition surge
 "The-moon wikispaces" opposition surge page
 Opposition surge on Saturn's B Ring as seen by Cassini–Huygens

Astronomical events
Lunar science
Optical phenomena
Observational astronomy
Radiometry
Scattering, absorption and radiative transfer (optics)